Uranothauma is a genus of butterflies in the family Lycaenidae. Its species are found in the Afrotropical realm.

Species
Uranothauma antinorii (Oberthür, 1883)
Uranothauma artemenes (Mabille, 1880)
Uranothauma belcastroi Larsen, 1997
Uranothauma confusa Kielland, 1989
Uranothauma cordatus (Sharpe, 1892)
Uranothauma crawshayi Butler, 1895
Uranothauma cuneatum Tite, 1958
Uranothauma delatorum Heron, 1909
Uranothauma falkensteini (Dewitz, 1879)
Uranothauma frederikkae Libert, 1993
Uranothauma heritsia (Hewitson, 1876)
Uranothauma kilimensis Kielland, 1985
Uranothauma lukwangule Kielland, 1987
Uranothauma lunifer (Rebel, 1914)
Uranothauma nguru Kielland, 1985
Uranothauma nubifer (Trimen, 1895)
Uranothauma poggei (Dewitz, 1879)
Uranothauma uganda Kielland, 1980
Uranothauma usambarae Kielland, 1980
Uranothauma vansomereni Stempffer, 1951
Uranothauma williamsi Carcasson, 1961

External links
"Uranothauma Butler, 1895" at Markku Savela's Lepidoptera and some other life forms
Seitz, A. Die Gross-Schmetterlinge der Erde 13: Die Afrikanischen Tagfalter. Plate XIII 73 and more

 
Lycaenidae genera